Brown's mabuya (Eutropis indeprensa) is a species of skink found in Indonesia, Malaysia, and the Philippines.

References

Eutropis
Reptiles described in 1980
Taxa named by Walter Creighton Brown
Taxa named by Angel Chua Alcala